Austin Proehl (born October 11, 1995) is an American football wide receiver for the St. Louis BattleHawks of the XFL. He played college football at North Carolina.

College career
Proehl played college football for University of North Carolina at Chapel Hill.

Professional career

Buffalo Bills
Proehl was drafted by the Buffalo Bills in the seventh round  (255th overall) of the 2018 NFL Draft. He was waived on September 1, 2018.

Tennessee Titans
On September 3, 2018, Proehl was signed to the Tennessee Titans' practice squad, but was released the following day.

Los Angeles Rams
On October 23, 2018, Proehl was signed to the Los Angeles Rams practice squad.

Proehl signed a reserve/future contract with the Rams on February 6, 2019. He was waived during final roster cuts on August 30, 2019.

Seattle Dragons
In October 2019, Proehl was drafted by the XFL to play for the Seattle Dragons. On February 8, 2020, Proehl caught 14-yard and 57-yard touchdown passes from Brandon Silvers, the former being the first touchdown in XFL history. He had his contract terminated when the league suspended operations on April 10, 2020.

Proehl had a tryout with the Chicago Bears on August 17, 2020.

San Francisco 49ers
On January 4, 2021, Proehl signed a reserve/future contract with the San Francisco 49ers. He was waived on May 17, 2021.

Los Angeles Chargers
On May 18, 2021, Proehl was claimed off waivers by the Los Angeles Chargers. He was waived on August 24, 2021 and re-signed to the practice squad on September 2. He was released on October 26.

Buffalo Bills (second stint)
On November 4, 2021, Proehl was signed to the Buffalo Bills practice squad. He was released on November 16. He was re-signed on December 24. He was released on January 4, 2022.

New York Giants
On February 15, 2022, Proehl signed a reserve/future contract with the New York Giants. He was released on August 16, 2022.

St. Louis BattleHawks
Proehl was selected in the 11th round of the 2023 XFL Skill Players Draft, by the St. Louis BattleHawks. His wide receiver coach with the BattleHawks is his father Ricky Proehl.

Personal life
Austin is the brother of Minnesota Vikings receiver Blake Proehl and the son of former NFL receiver Ricky Proehl. Ricky played college football at Wake Forest and played in the NFL from 1990 to 2006 for the Arizona Cardinals, Seattle Seahawks, Chicago Bears, St. Louis Rams, Carolina Panthers, and Indianapolis Colts.

References

External links
North Carolina Tar Heels Bio

1995 births
Living people
American football wide receivers
North Carolina Tar Heels football players
Players of American football from Charlotte, North Carolina
Buffalo Bills players
Tennessee Titans players
Los Angeles Rams players
Seattle Dragons players
San Francisco 49ers players
Los Angeles Chargers players
New York Giants players
St. Louis BattleHawks players